CCGS Alfred Needler was an offshore fishery science vessel operated by the Canadian Coast Guard. The vessel entered service in 1982 with the Department of Fisheries and Oceans, stationed at the Bedford Institute of Oceanography in Dartmouth, Nova Scotia. In 1995, in order to reduce the number of ships and combine tasks, the Fisheries and Oceans fleet and the Canadian Coast Guard fleets were merged under the Canadian Coast Guard.

Design and description
The research vessel is powered by one Caterpillar 3606 six-cylinder geared diesel engine driving one controllable pitch propeller creating . The vessel is also equipped with one Caterpillar 3306 emergency generator. The vessel has a complement of 21 composed of 7 officers and 14 crew and has 3 additional berths.

Service history

The research vessel was constructed for the Department of Fisheries and Oceans in 1982 by Ferguson Industries Limited at their yard in Pictou, Nova Scotia with the yard number 211. The ship entered service in August 1982. She was named after Canadian fisheries marine biologist Alfred Needler, a former Deputy Minister of Fisheries and Oceans who developed a method of accurate fish counts from small surveys.

In 1995, in an effort to combine tasks, administration and making savings in both ships and funds, the Fisheries and Oceans and Canadian Coast Guard fleets were merged under the command of the Canadian Coast Guard. Alfred Needler was given the new prefix CCGS as a result. The ship was based at Dartmouth, Nova Scotia although she is often alongside at the Bedford Institute of Oceanography. She was one of several fishery research vessels operated by the Government of Canada to monitor migratory fish stocks in the North Atlantic. Alfred Needler was used by Canada and the Northwest Atlantic Fisheries Organization (NAFO) to conduct fisheries surveys; as such, she retains the configuration of a commercial trawler, although her fish holds are converted to laboratory space.  The samples collected are used to study the population and health of various species of ocean life.

Alfred Needler experienced an engine room fire on 30 August 2003.  There were no casualties although the ship sustained $1.3 million in damage.  The cause of the fire was an oil leak in an incorrectly repaired turbocharger. In September 2009, the Department of Fisheries and Oceans announced invitations for contracts to replace several of the Coast Guard's research vessels, including Alfred Needler.

In July 2016, Alfred Needler discovered the wreck of a ship while trawling the waters off Nova Scotia. The vessel had been conducting an annual survey of the Georges Bank for the Department of Fisheries and Oceans. Alfred Needler began a $558,000 refit at St. John's Dockyard in St. John's, Newfoundland and Labrador in January 2018. The refit was scheduled to be completed in six weeks on 14 February, but additional steel work pushed the completion date to 1 April.  was scheduled to replace Alfred Needler on the Department of Fisheries and Oceans' fisheries survey off the coast of southern Nova Scotia in late March. During the annual summer fisheries survey on the Scotian Shelf in 2018, she had several mission critical equipment failures, forcing the cancellation of the survey. This marked the first time in 48 years that the survey was not completed. Teleost was used to complete an abbreviated version of the survey. After suffering a number of significant mechanical and structural failures the ship was decommissioned in February 2023.

References

Notes

Citations

Sources

External links
  Case Study: Maintenance failures and the need for current manuals,

Alfred Needler-class fisheries research ships
1980 ships
Ships built in Nova Scotia
Ships of the Canadian Coast Guard
Coast guards